The Walla Walla River is a tributary of the Columbia River, joining the Columbia just above Wallula Gap in southeastern Washington in the United States. The river flows through Umatilla County, Oregon, and Walla Walla County, Washington.

Course
The headwaters of the Walla Walla River lie in the Blue Mountains of northeastern Oregon. The river originates as the North and South Forks of the Walla Walla River. The surrounding forested land holds a network of hiking and mountain-biking trails.

The confluence of the North and South Forks lies east of Milton–Freewater, Oregon. The river flows eastward to reach Milton–Freewater, which is built along its banks, and then flows northward through Milton–Freewater. Irrigation water is drawn from the river here and at numerous locations along the river.

The Walla Walla River flows southwest of the city of Walla Walla in the Walla Walla valley. Mill Creek, which flows through the city of Walla Walla, joins the Walla Walla River at the Whitman Mission west of the city of Walla Walla.

The Touchet River joins the Walla Walla at the town of Touchet, Washington.

The river enters the Columbia a mile south of the town of Wallula just north of Wallula Gap. The section of the Columbia River is called Wallula Lake, the reservoir impoundment created by McNary Dam.

History

The Walla Walla tribe occupied the region around the Walla Walla river prior to white settlers entry to the region.

The Lewis and Clark Expedition (1804–1806) was the first United States overland expedition to the Pacific coast and back—the return expedition stopped at the mouth of the Walla Walla and stayed with the Walla Walla tribe for a portion of the journey, proceeding from there overland to the Snake River. British explorer David Thompson was the first European to navigate the entire length of the Columbia River, to the Pacific Ocean, in 1811.

Fort Nez Percés  (later known as Fort Walla Walla) was a fortified fur trading post on the Columbia River on the territory of modern-day Wallula, Washington. It was in operation from 1818 until 1857 on the eastern shore of the Columbia River, immediately north of the mouth of the Walla Walla River. The Oregon Treaty ended joint U.S.A. - British occupation that had been effect since the Treaty of 1818. The fort was abandoned in 1857 when the Hudson's Bay Company gave up its Columbia District business in the Oregon Territory.

The Whitman Mission was established in 1836. It lies near the banks of the river to the west of the modern city of Walla Walla.

Fish
The Walla Walla River supports populations of spring Chinook salmon, summer steelhead, and bull trout among other species.  There is a sport fishery for steelhead in the river.
It also holds channel catfish and smallmouth bass in the summer.

Science
Work done by Oregon and Washington State governments, federal and state environmental agencies and local watershed councils and groups on the Walla Walla River & the overall catchment area has produced a wide range of studies.  The Walla Walla Basin Watershed Council (WWBWC www.wwbwc.org) has both electronic and paper copies of many of these reports that date back to the 1930s. Considerable work has gone into the assessment of water quantity and quality for the purpose of salmon recovery and sustainable irrigation supply.  A highly-connected alluvial groundwater system and its over-abstraction through over-allocated irrigation usage have also acted to influence flows and quality in the Walla Walla River.

The promise of the Walla Walla River lies in its integrated water-management strategy using Managed Aquifer Recharge (Or Shallow Aquifer Recharge) to utilise available non-irrigation season water to replenish groundwater supplies and the over-allocation of groundwater resources by both state governments.  The Walla Walla partnership along with the WWBWC set a national example with this innovative and low-cost alternative to surface storage using dams.

Photos

See also
List of rivers of Oregon
List of longest streams of Oregon
List of tributaries of the Columbia River
List of Washington rivers
Walla Walla Basin Watershed Council

References

External links

 Flows and Forecasts on the Walla Walla River

Rivers of Oregon
Rivers of Washington (state)
Lewis and Clark Expedition
Tributaries of the Columbia River
Rivers of Umatilla County, Oregon